The Philippine House Committee on Local Government, or House Local Government Committee is a standing committee of the Philippine House of Representatives.

Jurisdiction 
As prescribed by House Rules, the committee's jurisdiction includes the following:
 Autonomous regions
 Barangays
 Municipalities
 Cities
 Provinces
 Revenues and expenditures of the said subdivisions

Members, 18th Congress

Historical members

18th Congress

Vice Chairperson 
 Francisco Datol Jr. (SENIOR CITIZENS)

Member for the Majority 
 Nestor Fongwan (Benguet–Lone, PDP–Laban)

See also
 House of Representatives of the Philippines
 List of Philippine House of Representatives committees
 Department of the Interior and Local Government

Notes

References

External links 
House of Representatives of the Philippines

Local
Local government in the Philippines